Calvary Cemetery is the main cemetery in Atuona, Hiva ‘Oa, French Polynesia.  It is located on a hillside on the eastern edge of town, overlooking the anchorage on Atuona Bay.

The cemetery is the final resting place of French Post-Impressionist painter Paul Gauguin, as well as of Belgian singer Jacques Brel.

See also

 Marquesas Islands
 French Polynesia
 Paul Gauguin Cultural Center

External links
 

Cemeteries in France
Marquesas Islands
Cemeteries in Oceania
Jacques Brel
Paul Gauguin